Warren County Public Schools, or Warren County Schools is a school district headquartered in Warrenton, North Carolina.

Dr. Ray Spain served as superintendent from circa 2003 until 2019, when he retired.
In July 2019 Dr. Mary Young became the superintendent with all members of the school board voting for her. She resigned in March 2021. In May Keith Sutton became the interim superintendent.

Schools
 High schools
Warren County High School
Warren Early College High School
Warren New Tech High School

 K-8 school
 Northside K-8 School

 Middle schools
 Warren County Middle School

 Elementary school
 Mariam Boyd Elementary School
 Vaughan Elementary School

References

External links
 Warren County Schools
School districts in North Carolina
Education in Warren County, North Carolina